Quacquarelli Symonds (QS) is a British company specialising in the analysis of higher education institutions around the world. The company was founded in 1990 by Nunzio Quacquarelli.

History
On 5 October 2017,  QS Quacquarelli Symonds acquired Hobsons Solutions, the international division of Hobsons, Inc. The acquisition allows QS to increase the size of its global product offering, which now incorporates products like QS' International Student Survey (formerly Hobsons' International Student Survey), which is the world's largest survey of prospective international students.

Major rankings

QS World University Rankings is regarded as one of the three most influential university rankings in the world, along with Times Higher Education World University Rankings and the Academic Ranking of World Universities.

Events
Quacquarelli Symonds organises a range of international student recruitment events throughout the year. These are generally oriented towards introducing prospective students to university admissions staff, while also facilitating access to admissions advice and scholarships. In 2018, over 300 events were hosted, attended by 220,000 candidates, in 100 cities across 50 countries.
Separated into ‘tours’, QS’ event offerings typically comprise a series of university and business school fairs.

The QS World MBA Tour is the world's largest series of international business school fairs, attended by more than 60,000 candidates in 100 cities across 50 countries.

The QS World MBA Premium also focuses on MBA student recruitment, but invites only business schools ranked in the top 200 internationally, according to the QS World University Rankings. The event aims to provide a more holistic overview of an MBA degree, with enhanced focus on pre- and post-study processes and insights.

The QS World Grad School Tour focuses on international postgraduate programs, particularly specialised master's degrees and PhDs in FAME (Finance, Accounting, Management and Economics) and STEM disciplines.

The QS World University Tour has an emphasis on undergraduate student recruitment, inviting undergraduate programs only.

The QS Connect MBA and QS Connect Masters differ from other event series’ in that an open fair format is not followed. Instead, candidates take part in pre-arranged 1-to-1 interviews with admissions staff, based on pre-submitted CVs and academic profiles.

References

External links

British companies established in 1990
Education companies of the United Kingdom
Education companies established in 1990
1990 establishments in the United Kingdom